The 2010 Cleveland Browns season was the team's 62nd season as a professional sports franchise and its 58th season as a member of the National Football League (NFL).  The team failed to break the longest playoff appearance drought in franchise history, a current  streak of eight seasons without reaching the playoffs. The team finished 5–11, matching its win total from the 2009 season and placed third in the AFC North. This season marked the first season under the leadership of team president Mike Holmgren and general manager Tom Heckert.  It also marked the second season under head coach Eric Mangini.  The Browns played all of their home games at Cleveland Browns Stadium in Cleveland, Ohio.

Off-season

Personnel changes 
On December 21, 2009, the Browns hired Mike Holmgren, former Green Bay Packers head coach and Seattle Seahawks head coach and general manager, to take over as the team president. His duties will include personnel management and oversight over all operations.

Although many believed that the institution of Holmgren as president would lead to the firing of Browns' head coach Eric Mangini, he announced his intent to retain Mangini and the entire coaching staff for the 2010 season on January 7, 2010.

On January 10, the Browns hired former Philadelphia Eagles' general manager Tom Heckert as general manager, the first major hire by Holmgren.

Roster changes

Free agents 

* The Browns used a second-round tender on these players

Releases

Signings

Trades 

On March 5, the Browns traded DE Corey Williams and a seventh round pick in the 2010 NFL Draft to the Detroit Lions for a fifth round pick in 2010.

On March 8, the Browns traded a conditional draft pick in 2011 to the Seattle Seahawks for QB Seneca Wallace.

On March 14, the Browns traded QB Brady Quinn to the Denver Broncos for RB Peyton Hillis, a sixth round draft pick in 2011, and a conditional draft pick in 2012.

Also on March 14, the Browns traded LB Kamerion Wimbley to the Oakland Raiders for a 2010 third round draft pick.

On April 2, the Browns traded LB Alex Hall and 2010 fourth- and fifth- round draft picks (Nos. 105 and 137, respectively) to the Philadelphia Eagles for CB Sheldon Brown and LB Chris Gocong.

2010 Draft class 

The Browns did not have a fourth- or seventh-round selection

Undrafted free agents

Uniform changes
After wearing solid brown pants with their white away jerseys during their 2009 campaign, the Browns returned to wearing their traditional white pants with orange-brown-orange lining for their 2010 away games. Furthermore, they wore white socks with orange-brown-orange piping with these uniforms, bringing back the "classic" Browns away look, as well as marking a departure from the past decade when solid brown socks were worn with both the home and away uniforms. These changes were confirmed during the team's first preseason game against the Packers on August 14 and by Eric Mangini the following week.

Staff

Roster

Opening training camp roster

Week 1 roster

Final roster

Preseason

Preseason schedule

Regular season

Schedule 

Note: Intra-divisional opponents are in bold text.

Standings

Week-by-week results

Week 1: at Tampa Bay Buccaneers

The Cleveland Browns began their NFL season at Raymond James Stadium for a showdown against the Tampa Bay Buccaneers. In the first quarter, the Browns had the early lead as QB Jake Delhomme connected on a 41-yard touchdown pass to WR Mohamed Massaquoi, but the Buccaneers responded with a Connor Barth field goal. In the second quarter, the Browns increased their lead on a touchdown run by RB Peyton Hillis.  Near the end of the half, the Browns were driving down the field until Delhomme threw an interception that allowed the Buccaneers to score a touchdown in the half's closing seconds.  In the fourth quarter, the Buccaneers took the lead for good on a 33-yard touchdown pass from QB Josh Freeman to WR Micheal Spurlock.

With the loss, the Browns began their season at 0–1.

Week 2: vs. Kansas City Chiefs

The Browns played their home opener against the Kansas City Chiefs looking to bounce back from a close loss in Week 1 against the Buccaneers. With starting QB Jake Delhomme out with an ankle injury, Seneca Wallace started the game for the Browns. Chiefs K Ryan Succop started the scoring with an early field goal. In the second quarter, the Browns scored on a 1-yard run by RB Peyton Hillis, but soon gave the lead back on an interception returned by CB Brandon Flowers. However, the Browns took a 14–10 lead into halftime on a deep touchdown pass from Wallace to WR Josh Cribbs. After the half, the Browns' offense stalled, and Succop kicked two more field goals to give the Chiefs a 16–14 victory.

With the loss, the Browns fell to 0–2.

Week 3: at Baltimore Ravens

Still looking for a win the Browns flew to M&T Bank Stadium for an AFC North rivalry match against the Ravens. In  the 1st quarter the Browns took the early lead when kicker Phil Dawson made a 28-yard field goal, which didn't last very long after QB Joe Flacco found WR Anquan Boldin on an 8 and a 12-yard TD pass. After that the Browns replied and eventually got the lead back when RB Peyton Hillis made a 1-yard TD run, followed in the 4th quarter by QB Seneca Wallace completing a 1-yard TD pass to TE Benjamin Watson. Then the Browns fell behind when Flacco made a 27-yard TD pass to WR Anquan Boldin, followed by kicker Billy Cundiff nailing a 49-yard field goal.

With the loss, Cleveland fell to 0–3.

Week 4: vs. Cincinnati Bengals

Still looking for their first win of the season, the Browns went home for a Week 4 AFC North duel with the Cincinnati Bengals in Round 1 of 2010's Battle of Ohio.

Cleveland got the early lead in the first quarter as kicker Phil Dawson got a 30-yard field goal.  The Browns added onto their lead in the second quarter as quarterback Seneca Wallace completed a 24-yard touchdown pass to tight end Evan Moore.  The Bengals answered with kicker Mike Nugent's 24-yard field goal, followed by quarterback Carson Palmer finding wide receiver Terrell Owens on a 78-yard touchdown pass.  The Browns would close out the half with Dawson getting a 31-yard field goal after linebacker Scott Fujita blocked a Bengals field goal attempt.

In the third quarter, Cleveland picked up right where they left off as running back Peyton Hillis got a 1-yard touchdown run, followed by Dawson's 22-yard field goal.  Afterwards, Cincinnati answered with Nugent making a 25-yard field goal.  The Bengals tried to rally in the fourth quarter as Palmer found running back Brian Leonard on a 3-yard touchdown pass, yet the defense prevented Cincinnati from getting any closer.

With the win, the Browns improved to 1–3.

Week 5: vs. Atlanta Falcons

The Browns stayed at home for their Week 5 game against the Atlanta Falcons, and tried to build on their first win of the season. The Falcons scored first, on a 24-yard field goal by kicker Matt Bryant early in the second quarter. The Browns soon answered with a 19-yard touchdown pass from quarterback Seneca Wallace to running back Peyton Hillis. Bryant hit another field goal in the quarter to cut the Cleveland lead to one point. Wallace was injured near halftime, and did not return. In the second half, quarterback Jake Delhomme came out for the Browns, but the offense failed to generate any momentum other than a Phil Dawson field goal. The Falcons took the lead when wide receiver Roddy White caught a 45-yard pass from quarterback Matt Ryan. Cleveland tried to mount a comeback, but an interception return by defensive end Kroy Biermann sealed the win for Atlanta, 20–10.

With the loss, the Browns fell to 1–4.

Week 6: at Pittsburgh Steelers

Hoping to rebound from their loss to the Falcons, the Browns flew to Heinz Field for a Week 6 AFC North duel with their archrival, the Pittsburgh Steelers. The Browns were forced to start third string rookie quarterback Colt McCoy as injuries sidelined Jake Delhomme and Seneca Wallace. Cleveland delivered the opening punch in the first quarter as kicker Phil Dawson made a 39-yard field goal, his 235th field goal as a Cleveland Brown which broke Lou Groza's franchise record.  The Steelers would take the lead in the second quarter as quarterback Ben Roethlisberger completed a 29-yard touchdown pass to wide receiver Mike Wallace.

The Browns' deficit increased in the third quarter as Roethlisberger found wide receiver Hines Ward on an 8-yard touchdown pass.  Cleveland tried to rally as McCoy completed a 12-yard touchdown pass to tight end Benjamin Watson, but Pittsburgh would pull away with Roethlisberger's 14-yard touchdown pass to tight end Heath Miller.

With the loss, the Browns fell to 1–5.

Week 7: at New Orleans Saints

The Cleveland Browns headed south to the Louisiana Superdome for their Week 7 battle against the defending Super Bowl champion New Orleans Saints. Cleveland struck first, on a 23-yard field goal by kicker Phil Dawson and a 4-yard run by running back Peyton Hillis to take a 10–0 lead after one quarter. In the second quarter, New Orleans closed the gap on a Garrett Hartley-yard field goal, but the Browns answered with another Dawson field goal and a 30-yard interception return by linebacker David Bowens to push the lead to 20–3 at the half. Special teams played a large role for the Browns in the half, with a 62-yard punt return by Eric Wright thanks to a Josh Cribbs lateral, and a 68-yard rush on a fake punt by punter Reggie Hodges both leading to field goals.

In the fourth quarter, quarterback Drew Brees connected with tight end David Thomas to pull within 10, but another Dawson field goal and a second Bowens interception return sealed the win for the Browns.

With the win, the Browns entered their bye week at 2–5.  This win also marked the third consecutive season in which the Browns defeated the defending Super Bowl champion.

Week 9: vs. New England Patriots

Coming off their bye week, the Browns went home for their Week 9 intraconference duel with the New England Patriots.  Cleveland delivered the opening punch in the first quarter as kicker Phil Dawson hit a 38-yard field goal, followed by running back Peyton Hillis' 2-yard touchdown run.  The Patriots answered in the second quarter as quarterback Tom Brady completed a 2-yard touchdown pass to tight end Aaron Hernandez.  Cleveland struck back on a touchdown run by wide receiver Chansi Stuckey.

The Browns added onto their lead in the third quarter as rookie quarterback Colt McCoy got a 16-yard touchdown run.  Cleveland continued to pull away in the fourth quarter with another Dawson field goal.  New England tried to rally as Brady completed a 1-yard touchdown pass to Hernandez (with the extra point kicked by wide receiver Wes Welker), yet the Browns pulled away with Hillis' 35-yard touchdown run.

With the win, Cleveland improved to 3–5.  Hillis was named as the AFC offensive player of the week.

Week 10: vs. New York Jets

Coming off their win over the Patriots, the Browns stayed at home for a Week 10 duel with the New York Jets, in a game that marked head coach Eric Mangini coaching against his former team, former Browns WR Braylon Edwards making his first return to Cleveland since being traded, and Jets' head coach Rex Ryan coaching against his brother, Browns' defensive coordinator Rob Ryan.  The two teams exchanged early field goals before the Browns scored with a 12-yard touchdown run from RB Peyton Hillis.  In the Second quarter New York tied the game on a 25-yard pass from Mark Sanchez to WR Jerricho Cotchery.  After A Browns' field goal, the Jets would take the lead for the first time with a Sanchez 1-yard touchdown run late in the first half.

The third quarter started with a Jets' drive that lasted 19 plays and almost 10 minutes, but resulting in no points as K Nick Folk missed a short field goal.  The Jets added onto their lead in the fourth quarter with Folk making a 25-yard field goal.  On the Browns' next drive, rookie QB Colt McCoy drove the team down the field and the Browns scored on a 3-yard touchdown pass to Mohamed Massaquoi, to tie the game at 20 and send it into overtime.

In overtime, both teams squandered chances to win;  Browns WR Chansi Stuckey fumbled the ball in Jets' territory, Folk missed a field goal for the Jets, and Sanchez threw an interception near the goal line.  It was the Jets who would finally break through late in the overtime period as Sanchez completed the game-winning 37-yard touchdown pass to WR Santonio Holmes with only 16 seconds left.

With the loss, Cleveland fell to 3–6.

Week 11: at Jacksonville Jaguars

Coming off a last-second loss to the Jets, the Browns headed to Florida for their Week 11 duel with the Jacksonville Jaguars. The Jaguars struck first on a 47-yard field goal by Josh Scobee. In the second quarter, the Browns took the lead with an 11-yard pass from Colt McCoy to Peyton Hillis. But the Jaguars responded with David Garrard completing a 5-yard pass to Mike Thomas, and they took a 10–7 lead into halftime. In the third, the Jaguars turned the ball over on five straight possessions, but the Browns could only convert them into ten points, taking a 17–10 lead. In the fourth, Marcedes Lewis had a 14-yard touchdown reception, tying the game. The Browns retook the lead on a Phil Dawson field goal, but the Jaguars struck back with Maurice Jones-Drew running it in from a yard out. McCoy drove the Browns down the field, but Sean Considine intercepted his final pass, and the Jaguars defeated the Browns, 24–20.

With the loss, the Browns fell to 3–7.

Week 12: vs. Carolina Panthers

The Browns returned home for a Week 12 duel with the Carolina Panthers after suffering back-to-back last-second losses. Jake Delhomme returned to quarterback for Cleveland against his former team after missing eight games with an ankle injury. The Panthers scored on their opening possession on a 26-yard run by Mike Goodson, but the Browns stormed back, with Peyton Hillis rushing for a touchdown on three consecutive possessions. Carolina added two field goals by John Kasay to end the half, and the Browns led 21–13. In the third quarter, the Browns' offense fell apart, failing to score and turning the ball over twice. Captain Munnerlyn returned an interception for a touchdown, pulling the Panthers within one. In the fourth quarter, Kasay hit a 43-yard field goal to give the Panthers the lead, but Phil Dawson returned the favor and put the Browns back on top. In the final minute, Panthers' QB Jimmy Clausen drove his team down the field, but Kasay's 42-yard field goal attempt hit the left upright as time expired, and the Browns held on to win, 24–23

With the win, the Browns improved to 4–7.  This marked the Browns' first victory over the Panthers in franchise history, as the Browns lost each of the three previous meetings.

After the game, CB Joe Haden was named the Defensive Rookie of the Month for November.  In four games during the month, Haden recorded 15 tackles, seven defended passes, and three interceptions.  He became the first Browns' player to ever win this award.

Week 13: at Miami Dolphins

The Browns, coming off a close victory over the Panthers, headed to Sun Life Stadium for their Week 13 battle against the Miami Dolphins. After a scoreless first quarter, the Browns scored first on a Phil Dawson 32-yard field goal. The Dolphins tied it at the half with Dan Carpenter hitting a 60-yard field goal, the longest in franchise history. In the second half, Benjamin Watson gave the Browns a 10–3 lead with a 3-yard touchdown reception from Jake Delhomme. The Dolphins responded with Chad Henne driving Miami down the field and tying the game with an 11-yard touchdown pass to Anthony Fasano. Late in the fourth quarter, Mike Adams intercepted Henne's pass and returned it to the 2. The Browns bled out the clock, and Dawson hit the game-winning field goal as time expired, giving the Browns a 13–10 victory.

With the win, the Browns improved to 5–7, matching their win total from the 2009 season.

Week 14: at Buffalo Bills

The Browns headed to New York to take on the Buffalo Bills for their Week 14 duel. It was a low-scoring affair due to the freezing rain pelting the field for much of the game. On their opening drive, the Browns drove down to the Bills' one-yard line but could not get into the end. Kicker Phil Dawson kicked a 19-yard field goal in the first quarter. In the second quarter, Ryan Fitzpatrick connected with David Nelson on an 11-yard pass for the game's only touchdown, giving the Bills a 7–3 lead. Dawson hit another field goal to pull the Browns within one, but a Rian Lindell 30-yard field goal gave the Bills a 10–6 lead at the half. Several turnovers in the second half stopped the Browns from making progress down the field, and another Lindell field goal in the fourth quarter sent the Browns to a 13–6 loss. The lone high point for the Browns was Peyton Hillis, who became the first white running back to rush for over 1,000 yards in a season in 25 years.

With the loss, the Browns fell to 5–8 and were eliminated from playoff contention. This marks the eighth consecutive season in which the Browns failed to make the playoffs, a franchise record.

Week 15: at Cincinnati Bengals

Colt McCoy returned for the Cleveland Browns' week 15 Battle of Ohio against the Cincinnati Bengals. The Browns scored on their opening drive on a 20-yard pass from McCoy to Robert Royal. The Bengals answered with Cedric Benson's 18-yard run to tie the game. Over the rest of the second and third quarters, Clint Stitser hit three field goals to give the Bengals a 16–7 lead. After trading field goals in the fourth, the Browns got within two on a 46-yard pass to Brian Robiskie. However, the Browns failed to stop a third down conversion on the Bengals' next possession, and the Browns lost 19–17.

With the loss, the Browns fell to 5–9 and finished the season 2–6 on the road.

Week 16: vs. Baltimore Ravens

The Browns stayed home for their Week 16 AFC North battle with the Baltimore Ravens. The Browns scored first on a touchdown pass from wide receiver Mohamed Massaquoi to wide receiver Brian Robiskie. In the second quarter, the Ravens stormed back, with two field goals by Billy Cundiff and a touchdown pass from Joe Flacco to T. J. Houshmandzadeh. Phil Dawson hit a field goal late in the quarter to send the Browns into halftime down 13–10. The Browns opened the second half with a failed onside kick, which led to a Derrick Mason touchdown reception, and the Browns lost 20–10.

With the loss, the Browns fell to 5–10.

Week 17: vs. Pittsburgh Steelers

Hoping to close out their season on a positive note, the Browns stayed at home for a Week 17 AFC North rematch with the Pittsburgh Steelers.  Cleveland trailed early in the first quarter as Steelers quarterback Ben Roethlisberger threw a 56-yard touchdown pass to wide receiver Mike Wallace, followed by running back Rashard Mendenhall getting a 1-yard touchdown run.  The Browns answered in the second quarter with a 19-yard field goal from kicker Phil Dawson, but Pittsburgh struck back with Mendenhall's 1-yard touchdown run, followed by Roethlisberger's 4-yard touchdown pass to tight end Heath Miller, and kicker Shaun Suisham booting a 41-yard field goal.

The Steelers would add onto their lead in the third quarter as wide receiver Antwaan Randle El completed a 3-yard touchdown pass to wide receiver Hines Ward.  Afterwards, Pittsburgh closed out its dominating day in the fourth quarter with Suisham making a 24-yard field goal.  Cleveland would close out the game with rookie quarterback Colt McCoy finding wide receiver Brian Robiskie on a 20-yard touchdown pass, sending the Browns to their worst loss of the season, 41–9.

With the loss, the Browns closed out their season at 5–11, matching their 2009 record. They were 3–5 at home.

Mangini fired
The day after the season ended, team president Mike Holmgren fired head coach Eric Mangini after going 10–22 in two seasons.

2011 Pro Bowl 
Despite the team's poor performance, T Joe Thomas  and C Alex Mack  were named to the AFC roster in the 2011 Pro Bowl.  Thomas, who will be making his fourth consecutive Pro Bowl appearance, will be the team's starting left tackle.  Mack was originally selected as the second alternate at center, but was placed on the team after an injury to Nick Mangold of the New York Jets and Maurkice Pouncey of the Pittsburgh Steelers not being able to play because of the Steelers playing in Super Bowl XLV the following week.

In addition to Thomas and Mack, six Browns' players were named as alternates.  RB Peyton Hillis and G Eric Steinbach were named as second alternates; KR Josh Cribbs, ST Ray Ventrone, and FB Lawrence Vickers third alternates, and CB Joe Haden a fourth alternate at their respective positions.

References

External links 
 2010 Cleveland Browns at Pro Football Reference (Profootballreference.com)
 2010 Cleveland Browns Statistics at jt-sw.com
 2010 Cleveland Browns Schedule at jt-sw.com
 2010 Cleveland Browns at DatabaseFootball.com  

Cleveland Browns seasons
Cleveland Browns
Cleveland